Guilin (Standard Zhuang: Gveilinz; alternatively romanized as Kweilin) is a prefecture-level city in the northeast of China's Guangxi Zhuang Autonomous Region. It is situated on the west bank of the Li River and borders Hunan to the north. Its name means "forest of sweet osmanthus", owing to the large number of fragrant sweet osmanthus trees located in the region. The city has long been renowned for its scenery of karst topography.

Guilin is one of China's most popular tourist destinations, and the epithet "By water, by mountains, most lovely, Guilin" is often associated with the city. The State Council of China has designated Guilin a National Famous Historical and Cultural City, doing so in the first edition of the list.

History 

Before the Qin dynasty, Guilin region was settled by the Baiyue people. In 314 BC, a small settlement was established along the banks of the Li River.

During the Qin dynasty's (221–206 BC) campaigns against the state of Nanyue, the first administration was set up in the area around Guilin. The modern city was located within the Guilin Commandery, which is origin of the modern name "Guilin".

In 111 BC, during the reign of Emperor Wu of the Han dynasty, Shi'an County was established, which could be regarded as the beginning of the city.

In AD 507, the town was renamed Guizhou (Gui Prefecture).

In 634, Lingui County was established at the modern site of Guilin, under Gui Prefecture. In 868, Pang Xun rebelled against the Tang from Gui Prefecture.

Guilin prospered in the Tang and Song dynasties but remained a county. The city was also a nexus between the central government and the southwest border, and it was where regular armies were placed to guard that border. Canals were built through the city so that food supplies could be directly transported from the food-productive Yangtze plain to the farthest southwestern point of the empire.

In 997, Guangnan West Circuit, predecessor of modern Guangxi, was established, with Guizhou as the capital. In 1133, Guizhou was renamed Jingjiang Prefecture. In 1367, the name was changed to Guilin Prefecture.

In 1921, Guilin became one of the headquarters of the Northern Expeditionary Army led by Sun Yat-sen. In 1940, Guilin City was established. Guilin was the provincial capital of Guangxi before 1912 and from 1936 to 1949.

Guilin became one of the most important military, transport and cultural centers of China during the World War II. The city drastically expanded as refugees from all over China poured in, and by 1944 its population had grown from 70,000 pre-war to more than 500,000. It hosted intellectuals and artists including Guo Moruo, Mao Dun, Ba Jin, Tian Han, Xu Beihong, Feng Zikai and many others.

In 1950, the provincial capital of Guangxi was moved from Guilin to Nanning.

In 1981, Guilin was listed by the State Council as one of the four cities (the other three being Beijing, Hangzhou and Suzhou) where the protection of historical and cultural heritage, as well as natural scenery, should be treated as a priority project.

Administrative divisions 

Guilin administers seventeen county-level divisions, including 6 districts, 8 counties, 2 autonomous counties, and 1 county-level city.
District: 
Xiufeng District 
Xiangshan District 
Diecai District 
Qixing District 
Yanshan District
Lingui District
 County-level city:
Lipu city
 County: 
Yangshuo County
Lingchuan County 
Xing'an County 
Quanzhou County 
Yongfu County 
Ziyuan County
Guanyang County 
Pingle County
 Autonomous county: 
Gongcheng Yao Autonomous County
Longsheng Various Nationalities Autonomous County

Geography

Guilin is located in northern Guangxi, bordering Liuzhou to the west, Laibin to the southwest, Wuzhou to the south, Hezhou to the southeast, and within neighbouring Hunan, Huaihua to the northwest, Shaoyang to the north, and Yongzhou to the east. The topography of the area is marked by karst formations. The karsts surrounding Guilin are made of Triassic period limestone and dolomite rocks. The Li River flows through the city.

Hills and mountains: Diecai Hill, Elephant Trunk Hill, Wave-Subduing Hill, Lipu Mountains, Kitten Mountain, the highest peak of Guangxi, and Yao Hill
Caves: Reed Flute Cave, Seven-star Cave

Climate

Guilin has a monsoon-influenced humid subtropical climate (Köppen Cfa, bordering on Cwa), with short, mild winters, and long, hot, humid summers. Winter begins dry but becomes progressively wetter and cloudier. Spring is generally overcast and often rainy, while summer continues to be rainy though is the sunniest time of year. Autumn is sunny and dry. The annual rainfall is just under , and is delivered in bulk (~50%) from April to June, when the plum rains occur and often create the risk of flooding. With monthly percent possible sunshine ranging from 14% in March to 53% in September, the city receives 1,487 hours of bright sunshine annually.

Demographics
According to the 2020 Chinese census its population was 4,931,137 inhabitants whom 2,148,641 lived in the built-up (or metro) area made of 6 urban Districts plus Lingchuan County now being conurbated.
According to the 2010 Chinese census, the largest ethnic group in the prefecture-level city was Han Chinese, accounting for 84.53% of the total population. This was followed by Yao at 7.79% and Zhuang at 4.81%. Citizens of Guilin's urban area speak a dialect of Mandarin, while Pinghua is predominantly spoken in suburbs and surrounding areas.

Economy

 The GDP per capita was ¥41891 (ca. US$6569) in 2020, ranked no. 134 among 659 Chinese cities.
 Local industries: condoms, pharmaceutical goods, tires, machinery, fertilizer, silk, perfume, wine, tea, cinnamon, herbal medicine
Local agricultural products: Shatian Pomelo, summer orange, Fructus Momordicae, ginkgo, moon persimmon, Lipu Taro, Sanhua Alcohol, pepper sauce, fermented bean curd, Guilin Rice Noodle, water chestnut, grain, fish and dried bean milk cream in tight rolls

Until 1949 only a thermal power plant, a cement works, and some small textile mills existed as signs of industrialization in Guilin. However, since the 1950s Guilin has added electronics, engineering and agricultural equipment, medicine, rubber, buses, textile and cotton yarn factories. Food processing, including the processing of local agricultural produce, remains the most important industry. More recent and modern industry features high technology, and the tertiary industry characterized by tourism trading and service.

Transportation

Air

The airport is Guilin Liangjiang International Airport(ICAO:ZGKL, IATA:KWL). Airlines that fly to the airport are:

China Eastern
Asiana Airlines
China Southern
Air China
Hainan Airlines
Shanghai Airlines
Shandong Airlines
Xiamen Airlines
Tianjin Airlines
EVA Air
Air Asia
Beijing Capital Airlines
Hebei Airlines

Rail

Guilin has the most high-speed rail stations out of all cities in China.
Guilin station and Guilin North station are on the Hunan–Guangxi railway, Hengyang–Liuzhou intercity railway and Guiyang–Guangzhou high-speed railway, the main railways connecting Guangxi with central and southern China. Arriving at North station, high-speed trains between Guilin and Changsha and Beijing came into operation in December  2013. In December 2014, high-speed operations began connecting Guangzhou, Shenzhen, Guiyang, and Shanghai. This made it more convenient for people to come to Guilin. It takes only about 2 or 3 hours from Guangzhou to Guilin, 9 hours from Shanghai to Guilin and 13 hours from Beijing to Guilin.  Trains traveling between Kunming South and West Kowloon stations (for example) stop at Guilin West railway station.

Urban
The city's public transportation includes bus routes and taxis. Guilin is the leading city in Mainland China operating double-decker buses regularly on major routes; in its main street the double-deckers run one-by-one almost every minute. Sightseeing boats also run on the city's canals and lakes.

A Guilin Metro is planned for 7 lines by 2040 with 117 stations and a total length of 273.2 kilometres. Line 1 is planned to have been opened by 2025, and it will be 29.23 km with 13 stations.

Public colleges and universities

Guilin University of Technology
Guilin Medical University
Guilin University of Electronic Technology
Guangxi Normal University
Guilin University of Aerospace Technology
Guilin University
Note: Institutions without full-time bachelor programs are not listed.

Scenic spots

Scenic spots around Guilin include:
Jingjiang Princes City, a royal complex dating from the Ming Dynasty that lies near the center of modern Guilin
Reed Flute Cave
Silver Cave
Li River
Yangshuo
Seven-star Cave and Seven Star Park
Camel Mountain and Elephant Trunk Hill
Piled Festoon Hill
Crescent Hill
Fubo Hill
Nanxi Hill
Erlang Gorge
Huangbu (Yellow Cloth) Beach
Moon Hill
Longsheng Rice Terrace
Daxu Ancient Town
Xingping Ancient Town
Duxiu, Solitary Beauty Peak
Liusanjie Landscape Garden
Yao Hill
Sun and Moon Pagodas

Cuisine

Guilin cuisine is a mixture of Cantonese cuisine and Zhuang cuisine. It is known for its snacks and the use of spices, especially chili. Guilin chili sauce, used widely in cooking by locals, is made of fresh chili, garlic, and fermented soybeans, and is considered one of the city's Three Treasures. The other two of the Three Treasures are Guilin Sanhua Jiu, a variety of rice baijiu, or liquor distilled from rice; and Guilin pickled tofu.

Guilin rice noodles have been the local breakfast staple since the Qin dynasty and are renowned for their delicate taste. Legend has it that when Qin troops suffering from diarrhea entered this region, a cook created the Guilin rice noodles for the army because they had trouble eating the local food. Specifically, the local specialty is noodles with horse meat, but this dish can also be ordered without the horse meat. Zongzi, a dumpling made from glutinous rice and mung bean paste wrapped in a bamboo or banana leaf is another popular delicacy in Guilin.

Quotes
"I often sent pictures of the hills of Guilin which I painted to friends back home, but few believed what they saw."
- Fan Chengda (Chinese Song Dynasty scholar)
"Guilin's scenery is best among all under heaven."
- popular Chinese saying

International relations

Twin towns—Sister cities
Guilin is twinned with:

 – Nishikatsura, Yamanashi, Japan – Lingchuan County
 – Kumamoto City, Japan – Guilin
 – Toride City, Japan – Guilin
 – Miho, Ibaraki, Japan – Lingui
 – Jeju, South Korea
 – Hastings, New Zealand
 – Toruń, Poland
 – Orlando, United States
 – Tlaxcoapan, Hidalgo, Mexico
 – Langkawi, Malaysia

The Guilin relationship with the New Zealand city Hastings started in 1977, after a research scientist, Stuart Falconer, identified a number of common areas of interest between the two cities, including horticulture and their rural-urban mix.
In 1997 Guilin commenced an exchange relationship with Ōta, Gunma, Japan.

Notable residents
 Daniel Weihs (born 1942), Israeli Aeronautical Engineering professor at the Technion – Israel Institute of Technology
 Ou Hongyi (born 2002), climate activist
 Pai Hsien-yung (born 1937), writer
 Ouyang Xiadan, news anchor for China Central Television

See also
 Bai Chongxi
 Alcoholic drinks in China
 Li Zongren

References

Further reading 
 "Guilin (China")—Britannica Online Encyclopedia

External links

 Guilin Government Official website 

 
314 BC
310s BC establishments
4th-century BC establishments in China
Cities in Guangxi
Populated places established in the 4th century BC
Prefecture-level divisions of Guangxi